The douk-douk is a French-made pocket knife of simple sheet-metal construction. It has been manufactured by the M. C. Cognet cutlery firm in Thiers, France, since 1929.

Design origins
The external engraving of the douk-douk was created in 1929 by Gaspard Cognet of Cognet, Antoine & Gaspard for sales to France's colonies in Oceania.  The handle depicts a "douk-douk", or Melanesian spirit incarnation.  Cognet based the design on an engraving in an illustrated dictionary.  Later other designs such as the "El Baraka" and "Tiki" were developed for other regional markets, particularly in French Algeria, and even south into Sub-Saharan Africa.

Originally intended as an inexpensive utility pocket knife for the ordinary working man, the popularity of the douk-douk caused it to be pressed into service as a weapon when necessary.  During the 1954-1962 FLN-led revolt in Algeria, the douk-douk was used as weapon of assassination and terror; Algerians who ran afoul of the FLN frequently had their noses removed with a knife, many of them douk-douks (or more properly the El Baraka model which was sold in Algeria, due to Muslim ideals on what sorts of images were appropriate).  It could easily be converted from a folding-blade pocket knife into a useful fixed-blade knife by the simple expedient of hammering the ends of the sheet-metal handle together behind the blade's bolster, locking the blade into the full-open position.

Description
The douk-douk is a very simple slipjoint knife, having no locking mechanism, but only a very strong backspring to bias it towards the open, closed and 90 degree positions. This intermediate position is to help prevent the blade from snapping shut on the users fingers if the user accidentally folds the blade while cutting. The knife consists of only six parts:

A folded sheet-metal handle, which is very slim
A blade, of a soft and easily sharpened steel, generally of the "Turkish clip" profile reminiscent of a scimitar.  The blade has indentations at the back, and is decorated with acid-engraved arabesques.  The blade has no nail-nick, but is easily grasped for opening since it tapers at the spine.
A strong backspring
Two rivets: one to hold the blade, the other to hold the backspring and bail
A metal bail or lanyard loop

The cutlery firm of M.C. Cognet has continued to produce the knife up to the present day, using the same simple methods.  Today they are offered with several decorative designs, stainless or carbon steel blades, in three different sizes.

Variants
Current variants
 Sorcier (Sorcerer) — Standard pattern. Blued handle, engraved with the image of "Douk Douk", a Melanesian mythical figure
 El-Baraka — Nickel-plated handle, engraved with a Tuareg Cross of Agadez (allegedly marketed to Muslim colonies in North Africa where the humanoid figure of the Sorcier model would be culturally inappropriate)
 Tiki — Engraved with a Polynesian tiki idol
 l'Écureuil (Squirrel) — Nickel-plated handle, engraved with a squirrel.  Primarily marketed within France.  Unlike most other variants, L'écureuil has a spear profile blade.

See also
 Higonokami - A similar traditional Japanese pocket knife
 Mercator K55K - Earlier, very similar German knife
  Okapi - A similar South African pocket knife
 Opinel - Another iconic French pocket knife with a simple, low cost design

References

External links
 Site officiel de la coutellerie M.C.Cognet
 All kinds of Douk Douk review

Sources
Gérard Pacella. Couteaux de nos Terroirs. Editions de Borée, 2005. , 9782844943255. Pg. 26 

Pocket knives
French culture
Weapons and ammunition introduced in 1929
Algerian War